Susanna Kwan Kuk-ying (born May 3, 1958) is a Hong Kong singer and actress.

Background
She has recently been an actress for a number of TVB shows. Her nickname is "Big Doll" or "Small Sworn Mother" (as her performance in Wong Sau-kum of Heart of Greed). She had been married to Michael Lai Siu-tin followed by a divorce. From February 5, 1990 to 2005, she lived in Canada. She returned to Hong Kong after TVB invited her to be the host of a singing program. In July 2015, Kwan ended her eight-year relationship with TVB.

Filmography

TV series

Discography

Drama Soundtracks

Awards
TVB Anniversary Awards (2007)
 Won: My Favourite Female Character as Wong Sau Kam in Heart of Greed 
 Nominated: Best Actress as Wong Sau Kam in Heart of Greed
TVB Anniversary Awards (2008)
 Nominated: Best Actress as Chung Siu Sa in Moonlight Resonance
 Nominated: My Favourite Female Character as Chung Siu Sa in Moonlight Resonance
Astro Wah Lai Toi Drama Awards 2008
 Nominated: My Favourite Female Character as Wong Sau Kam in Heart of Greed
 'Won: Most Favourite Theme Song Award for the song "Speechless" in Heart of Greed''

References

External links
Official TVB Blog

 
|-
! colspan="3" style="background:#DAA520;" | TVB Anniversary Awards
|-

1958 births
Living people
20th-century Hong Kong women singers
Hong Kong television actresses
TVB veteran actors
20th-century Hong Kong actresses
21st-century Hong Kong actresses
Hong Kong expatriates in Canada
21st-century Hong Kong women singers